Philosophy and Real Politics is a 2008 book by British philosopher and scholar Raymond Geuss whose main subject is the relationship between politics and human needs. The book is an expansion of a lecture given at the University of Athens in April 2007 under the title 'Lenin, Rawls and Political Philosophy'. The book has been regarded as a remarkable contribution to the social sciences due to its author's rejection of the popular politics as applied ethics approach in the current philosophical and political landscape. Professor Geuss argues that a dried and disembodied view of politics is the result of certain western philosophical traditions. Geuss points out that the recent and ongoing social conflicts call into question whether politics can be reduced to the realm of ethics without previously taking into account the needs, motivations and goals behind people's actions.

Part 1: Realism
The first part of the book deals with what Geuss calls the 'realist approach to political philosophy'. According to him, since Hobbes this approach has been persistent among political scientists but it tends to overlook the fact that historical and geographical differences among societies and cultures play a major role in the concepts of 'order' and 'intolerable disorder'. Geuss notes that nowadays the freedom to own private firearms is generally rejected in western European societies, while in the United States this is something considered natural. The way a given society adopts cultural and behavioural traits may be completely different from, and sometimes, opposed to, another; leading to conflicts and frictions that are perfectly supported by either side but incomprehensible to third parties.

Part 2: Failures of Realism 
Part two is devoted to the failures of the realist approach in political philosophy. The author discusses a variety of concepts such as equality, fairness, ignorance and impartiality. Using many examples from history (William Morris' utopias, Kantian philosophy) and everyday social life, Geuss concludes that those concepts are subject to many conditions and a closer inspection is needed in order to overcome their apparent universality. Then, politics is not a framework of theories, Geuss argues, but more like a skill or a craft that needs to be practised and improved through critical inspection.

See also 
Philosophy of Politics
John Rawls
Philosophy and the Mirror of Nature
 Utopia for Realists

References

External links 
Law & Politics Book Review: Philosophy and Real Politics
The Philosopher's Zone - Getting down to reality: Raymond Geuss (audio)

2008 non-fiction books
Books in political philosophy
Ethics books
Contemporary philosophical literature
Political realism